Erna Mirzoyan ( born in 1998), better known by her stage name Erna Mir, is an Armenian singer. In 2017, Erna represented Armenia at the New Wave international contest in Sochi and won it along with DoReDoS and Sardor Milano. The singer has also competed in The Voice of Armenia in 2014 and advanced to the final.

References

1998 births
21st-century Armenian  women singers
Armenian Apostolic Christians
Armenian women singer-songwriters
Armenian pop singers
Living people
People from Stepanakert
Armenian folk-pop singers
New Wave winners